Tarantulas: The Deadly Cargo is a 1977 American made-for-television horror film directed by Stuart Hagmann and starring Claude Akins, Charles Frank, Deborah Winters, Matthew Laborteaux and Pat Hingle. The film was produced by Alan Landsburg Productions and broadcast on CBS on December 28, 1977.

Plot
In Ecuador, two reckless money-hungry pilots bribe officials in order to fly a load of coffee beans from South America into the United States. To pay off the officials, they sneak aboard three passengers whom they agree to smuggle into the U.S.

Problems arise when sacks of the beans containing deadly tarantulas are loaded into the cargo bay. During the flight, the venomous arachnids, irritated by the plane's vibration and high altitude, escape from the sacks during a fierce thunderstorm. As the plane wobbles under the torrential rains, the sacks split open, spilling the beans and the noxious spiders. The three illegal immigrants are trapped in the cargo hold with the spiders. They vainly attempt to hold off the spiders with their shoes or whatever swat-material they can find. The lethal spiders eventually overcome all three.

Meanwhile, in the cockpit, the pilots work to overcome a developing mechanical problem that endangers the aircraft. They realize they must make an emergency landing as they pass over the orange-producing town of Finleyville, California. Unbeknownst to the pilots, the arachnids have escaped and begin to swarm the cockpit, attacking the pilots. The plane crash-lands near Finleyville.

The city's emergency response system moves to aid the downed aircraft and pilots. A fire breaks out at the crash site and the deadly tarantulas scurry from the location toward a nearby orange grove. The fire is brought under control and the pilots and passengers are pulled from the airplane. Those not killed begin to exhibit strange symptoms. The town's physician, Dr. Hodgins (Pat Hingle), is baffled until a local citizen who has been bitten, suddenly drops to the ground.

Cindy Beck (Deborah Winters) and her fiancé (Charles Frank) aid with the investigation. Her brother Matthew (Matthew Laborteaux) finds a spider, but no one listens to him.

A family of aviators, the Beck family, attempts to solve the puzzle of why the plane crashed. They are told that the tarantulas are actually banana spiders, described as "the most aggressive and venomous spider in the world". In the meantime, the tarantulas continue their attacks, and more people are brought into Dr. Hodgins’ clinic. The doctor finally figures it out, but by this time, the spiders have spread out. The city's mayor is fearful that any news of the problem infesting the city's oranges will bring the township financial ruin.

Bert Springer (Claude Akins), one of the city's responsible citizens, helps the Beck family investigate. Cindy's brother is bitten and incapacitated by the spider and dies. Bert organizes the town citizens, and they risk their lives trying to save the town as the food-seeking spiders converge on the orange packaging plant.

The plan to get rid of the spiders involves exposing the deadly arachnids to the buzzing sounds of their enemy: wasps. Using an amplified sound of wasps buzzing, the tarantulas are rendered motionless. This allows a crew of townsfolk to collect the spiders in buckets full of alcohol, which kills them. During the process, the electrical system switches off, and the crew are suddenly surrounded by the deadly spiders when the doors, which are electrically controlled, slam shut. A local teacher crawls in through a window near the roof and leads them out to safety. When the power comes back on, the crew returns to take care of the remainder of the spiders.

Cast
 Claude Akins (VF: Henry Djanick).........Bert Springer
 Charles Frank..........Joe Harmon
 Deborah Winters........Cindy Beck
 Matthew Laborteaux.....Matthew Beck
 Sandy McPeak...........Chief Beasley
 Penelope Windust.......Gloria Beasley
 Tom Atkins (VF: Pierre Hatet)....Buddy
 Howard Hesseman........Fred
 Bert Remsen (VF: Jean Berger)...Mayor Douglas
 Pat Hingle (VF: René Renot)...Doc Hodgins
 Charles Siebert... Rich Finley

Awards and nominations
Emmy Award
Nominated, "Outstanding Achievement in Film Sound Editing for a Special" 
Nominated, "Outstanding Achievement in Film Sound Mixing"

References

External links

1977 films
1977 horror films
1977 television films
American horror television films
Films about spiders
American aviation films
CBS network films
American natural horror films
Films directed by Stuart Hagmann
1970s American films